Hudo may refer to:

Hudo (scouting), an outdoor pit toilet

Places in Slovenia
Hudo, Domžale, a settlement in the Municipality of Domžale
Hudo, Tržič, a settlement in the Municipality of Tržič
Malo Hudo, a settlement in the Municipality of Ivančna Gorica (known as Hudo until 1953)